The Grosse Panzergranate 46 & 61 were shaped charge rifle grenades that were developed by Germany and used by the Waffen-SS during World War II.

History 
During World War II the German armed services all competed for scarce resources and their leadership would often not cooperate with each other.  The effect of this competition and non-cooperation was that each service developed its own procurement channels and often its own weapons.  While some weapons were compatible others were not.  Since the Waffen-SS was the military arm of the Nazi Party it was forced to develop its own procurement channels since the army's production resources were overstretched.  The Waffen-SS arms design office in Brno Czechoslovakia designed the Grosse Panzergranate 46 in 1943 while the Grosse Panzergranate 61 was developed in 1944.  Both were launched by a blank cartridge from the same Gewehrgranatengerät or Schiessbecher ("shooting cup") used by the army.  While they were compatible with army shaped-charge rifle grenades their construction and performance were different.  Developed late in the war both types were produced in small numbers.

Design 

The primary components of the Grosse Panzergranate 46 & 61 were a nose cap, internal steel cone, steel upper body, steel lower body, rifled driving band, TNT filling, and a base fuze.  The Grosse Panzergranate 46 & 61 were anti-armor weapons like their predecessor the Gewehr-Panzergranate but were larger, had better penetration, and better range. The Grosse Panzergranate 46 & 61 upon hitting the target ignited the base fuze which in turn ignited the TNT filling which collapsed the internal steel cone to create a superplastic high-velocity jet to punch through enemy armor.  In general, a longer and wider internal cone equates to increased armor penetration.  Since shaped charge weapons rely on chemical energy to penetrate enemy armor the low velocity of the grenade did not adversely affect penetration.  The Grosse Panzergranate 46 could penetrate  while the Grosse Panzergranate 61 could penetrate  of rolled homogeneous armor.

References

Bibliography

 Michael Heidler:  Deutsche Gewehrgranaten und Gewehrgranatgeräte bis 1945, Verlag VDM Heinz Nickel, 2010, 

Grenades of Germany
Rifle grenades
World War II weapons of Germany
Weapons and ammunition introduced in 1943